Campululidae is a family of flatworms belonging to the order Plagiorchiida.

Genera:
 Hadwenius
 Orthosplanchus

References

Platyhelminthes